Carlos Raúl Sciucatti (born January 7, 1986 in Buenos Aires) is an Argentine footballer who last played for Mitra Kukar.

Careers

Argentina
He played for Independiente de Avellaneda from January 2006 to June 2007 in Argentina Primera Division with 2 caps and 1 goals

Colombia
He transferred from Independiente to Academia. He played for Academia from July 2007 to December 2007.

Indonesia
He started his career in Indonesia at the club Persijap Jepara. In the winter transfer window of 2008-09 season he moved to Persela Lamongan he scored 5 goals in 14 matches. In summer transfer he moved to Persidafon Dafonsoro. And now he Free Agent.

References

1986 births
Association football forwards
Argentine expatriate footballers
Argentine expatriate sportspeople in Indonesia
Argentine footballers
Expatriate footballers in Colombia
Expatriate footballers in Indonesia
Living people
Footballers from Buenos Aires
Club Atlético Independiente footballers
Argentine Primera División players
Academia F.C. players
Categoría Primera B players
Persela Lamongan players
Persijap Jepara players
Liga 1 (Indonesia) players
Persidafon Dafonsoro players
Pro Duta FC players
PSLS Lhokseumawe players
Indonesian Premier Division players